Samer Salem may refer to:

 Samer Salem (footballer, born 1992), Saudi footballer for Al-Najma
 Samer Salem (footballer, born 1993), Syrian footballer for Hutteen